Équilibre or L'équilibre or En équilibre may refer to:

L'équilibre (Emmanuel Moire album)
L'équilibre (Kyo album)
En équilibre 2015 French drama film written and directed by Denis Dercourt
L'Équilibre instable album  by French singer Stanislas  2007
En équilibre, album by Suarez (band) 2014
"L'Équilibre", song by Kyo from L'équilibre (Kyo album)